Sơn Đoòng cave, in Phong Nha-Kẻ Bàng National Park, Bố Trạch District, Quảng Bình Province, Vietnam, is one of the world's largest natural caves.

Located near the Laos–Vietnam border, Hang Sơn Đoòng has an internal, fast-flowing subterranean river and the largest cross-section of any cave, worldwide, as of 2009, believed to be twice that of the next largest passage. It is the largest known cave passage in the world by volume.

Its name, Hang Sơn Đoòng, is variously translated from Vietnamese as 'cave of the mountain river' or 'cave of mountains behind Đoòng [village]'.

As a solutional cave, it was formed in soluble limestone and is believed to be between 2 and 5 million years old.

Discovery
The entrance to Hang Sơn Đoòng was found in 1991 by a local man named Hồ Khanh, while searching for agarwood, a valuable timber. Although he initially went to investigate further, he was discouraged upon approach by the sound of rushing water and the strong wind issuing from the entrance. Not thinking it to be of any great importance, by the time he returned to his home he had forgotten the exact location of the entrance. Later, he mentioned his discovery in passing to two members of the British Cave Research Association who were exploring in the local area. They asked him to attempt to rediscover the entrance, which he eventually managed to do in 2008, and in 2009 he led an expedition from the BCRA to the entrance.

The expedition returned in March 2010 and successfully traversed the wall, which allowed the explorers to reach the end of the cave passage. They estimated that the overall length of the cave system exceeded .

Description
Formed in Carboniferous/Permian limestone, the main Sơn Đoòng cave passage is the largest known cave passage in the world by volume – , according to BRCA expedition leader Howard Limbert. Its cross-section is believed to be twice that of the next largest passage, in Deer Cave, Malaysia. The dolines allow sunlight to enter sections of the cave, resulting in the growth of trees as well as other vegetation.

By mid-2019, it became clear that the cave is connected by its underground river with a nearby cave called Hang Thung.

Behind the Great Wall of Vietnam were found cave pearls the size of baseballs, an abnormally large size. The cave's interior is so large that it could fit an entire New York block inside, including skyscrapers, or could have a Boeing 747 fly through it without its wings touching either side.

Tourist activities
In early August 2013, the first tourist group explored the cave on a guided tour at a cost of US$3,000 each. Permits are required to access the cave and are made available on a limited basis, limited to January to August. After August, heavy rains cause river levels to rise, making the cave largely inaccessible. , only Oxalis Adventure Tours have permission to enter the cave for tourism purposes.

Development plans
Plans were considered to build a cable car through the cave. However, the plans were opposed by environmentalists and locals because of the damage mass tourism could cause to the cave and local environment. The plan was ultimately cancelled by local government.

References

External links

  National Geographic pictorial of Hang Sơn Đoòng
  Saigon-online-SonDoong-cave 
 
 Chùm ảnh khám phá hang động đẹp và lớn nhất thế giới(includes images) Quảng Bình Province  
  The Telegraph Online 
 
 
 

Caves of Vietnam
Landforms of Quảng Bình province
2009 in Vietnam
Hang Sơn Đoòng
Show caves in Vietnam